Demoso District is the district of Kayah State, Myanmar. Its principal town is Demoso.

Townships

The townships, cities, towns that are included in Demoso District are as follows:
Demoso Township
Demoso
Nanmekon
Hpruso Township
Hpruso

History
On April 30, 2022, new districts were expanded and organized. Demoso Township and Hpruso Township from Loikaw District are formed as Demoso District.

References

Districts of Myanmar
Kayah State